Dinsmore is a village in the Canadian province of Saskatchewan within the Rural Municipality of Milden No. 286 and Census Division No. 12.

History 
Dinsmore incorporated as a village on November 3, 1913.

Demographics 

See also
 List of communities in Saskatchewan
 Villages of Saskatchewan
 Dinsmore Aerodrome

References

External links

Villages in Saskatchewan
Milden No. 286, Saskatchewan
Division No. 12, Saskatchewan